Municipal elections were held in the Czech Republic on 13 and 14 November 1998. A total of 62,412 seats were up for election, of which more than 30,000 were won by independent candidates- Voter turnout was 45.02%.

Results

References

1998
1998 elections in the Czech Republic
November 1998 events in Europe